Taisto Lempinen (4 October 1914 – 2 April 1970) was a Finnish wrestler. He competed in the men's Greco-Roman bantamweight at the 1948 Summer Olympics.

References

External links
 

1914 births
1970 deaths
Finnish male sport wrestlers
Olympic wrestlers of Finland
Wrestlers at the 1948 Summer Olympics
Sportspeople from Kymenlaakso